Sanjabad may refer to:
 Sanjabad, Ardabil
 Sanjabad-e Gharbi Rural District
 Sanjabad-e Jonubi Rural District
 Sanjabad-e Sharqi Rural District
 Sanjabad-e Shomali Rural District